Richard Cockerill (born 16 December 1970) is an English rugby union coach and former player, he was the  national team's interim head coach between Eddie Jones and Steve Borthwick. He won five league titles, two European Cups and two domestic cups as a player.

Following his retirement from playing in 2005 Cockerill became Leicester's forwards coach, becoming head coach in 2009.  He led Leicester to Premiership titles in 2009 and 2010, his first two years in charge, and a third title in 2013.  After leaving Leicester he joined Toulon in 2017 on a temporary basis but succeeded in taking them to the final of the 2016-17 Top 14 season where they lost to Clermont.

In 2017 he was named as the head coach of Guinness Pro14 side Edinburgh Rugby, leading them to the Pro 14 playoffs for the first time.  He extended his contract in April 2018 to remain as head coach with Edinburgh until 2021.

He left Edinburgh when his contract expired in 2021 and was appointed to Eddie Jones'  coaching staff.

After Eddie Jones, Cockerill was appointed interim England coach in 2022.

Playing career

Cockerill was born in Rugby.  Joining Leicester Tigers, he established himself as the B of the "ABC club" alongside Graham Rowntree (A) and Darren Garforth (C). Cockerill was an unused replacement for both the 2001 and 2002 Heineken Cup finals.

He made his England debut against Argentina in 1997 and later his first match at Twickenham was as a half-time replacement for the Bath hooker Andy Long in Clive Woodward's first match in charge against the Wallabies; Long was young and clearly out of his depth. Cockerill's performance earned him a starting place against New Zealand, where he stood up to Norm Hewitt during the haka (see book cover).

A dip in form led him to lose his first choice hooking position at Leicester to Dorian West.  He was also dropped from the England side after criticising Woodward in his book entitled In Your Face. He subsequently moved to France, but signed again for Leicester for the 2004–05 season.

Coaching career

In 2005 he was appointed forwards coach at Leicester Tigers succeeding John Wells.
Cockerill served as acting head coach of Leicester Tigers in the early part of the 2007–08 season before Marcelo Loffreda arrived from Argentina in the wake of the Pumas' third-place finish in the 2007 Rugby World Cup.  He also took over as acting head coach in February 2009 after Heyneke Meyer resigned due to family reasons. On 17 April 2009, Cockerill was confirmed in the head coach role.
On 16 May he guided Leicester to win the Premiership with a 10–9 win over London Irish in the final. A week later they lost in the final of the Heineken cup to Leinster 19–16 in Edinburgh. In the 2009–10 season Cockerill also led The Tigers to a second Premiership title in a row with a win over Saracens at Twickenham.
On 13 December 2016, it was announced that Cockerill was to be fired from his position if he did not 'turn a corner' and subsequent defeats against various teams along with the players themselves asking for a change. On 2 January 2017 he was sacked after a home loss to Saracens in the Premiership. 

Four days later, on 6 January 2017, he found a position with French TOP 14 team Toulon as a member of the coaching  team for the 2016-2017 season.

On 20 February 2017, it was announced Cockerill has been appointed as head coach of Edinburgh Rugby for the 2017–18 Pro14 season. Following a downturn in results in the 2020/21 season it was announced in July 2021 that Cockerill would be leaving the club ahead of the 2021/22 season after 4 years in charge. 

On 3 September 2021, Cockerill was announced as 's new forwards coach, in Eddie Jones' coaching team.

After Eddie Jones was fired from his England post in December 2022, Cockerill was appointed interim England coach.

Bibliography 
 Richard Cockerill (with Michael Tanner as a ghost writer) In Your Face: A Rugby Odyssey

References

External links
Sporting heroes
Tigers Coaches 2008–09
Tigers player profile

1970 births
Living people
ASM Clermont Auvergne players
Coventry R.F.C. players
England international rugby union players
English rugby union coaches
English rugby union players
Leicester Tigers coaches
Leicester Tigers players
RC Toulonnais coaches
Rugby union hookers
Rugby union players from Rugby, Warwickshire